Sidney John Robinson (1 August 1876 in Denton, Northamptonshire – 3 February 1959 in Long Sutton, Lincolnshire) was an early twentieth century English middle-distance athlete who specialised in the steeplechase.

He participated at the 1900 Summer Olympics in Paris for the United Kingdom and won three medals, the silver medal in the 2500 metre event beating the Frenchman Jacques Chastanié to second place and a bronze medal in the 4000 metres steeplechase. He also won the gold medal in the 5000 metres team race as part of a mixed team with Charles Bennett, John Rimmer, Alfred Tysoe and Stan Rowley.

References

External links

1876 births
1959 deaths
English male middle-distance runners
Olympic athletes of Great Britain
English Olympic medallists
Olympic gold medallists for Great Britain
Olympic silver medallists for Great Britain
Olympic bronze medallists for Great Britain
Athletes (track and field) at the 1900 Summer Olympics
English male steeplechase runners
Medalists at the 1900 Summer Olympics
Olympic gold medalists in athletics (track and field)
Olympic silver medalists in athletics (track and field)
Olympic bronze medalists in athletics (track and field)
International Cross Country Championships winners
People from Northamptonshire (before 1974)